"The Closer You Get" is a song recorded by American country music band Exile.  It was released in 1981.

About the song
"The Closer You Get" was written in 1980 by J.P. Pennington and Mark Gray, members of Exile. However, the song was not immediately recorded by Alabama. Two earlier versions were released as singles – the first by Exile (which failed to gain much attention) and singer Don King, whose version reached No. 27 on the Billboard Hot Country Singles chart in October 1981. In addition, Rita Coolidge recorded the song for her 1981 album, Heartbreak Radio, and released her version as a single.

Alabama's version differed substantially from King's acoustic version. According to country music writer Tom Roland, the song featured "distorted guitars, a more elaborate arrangement and an altered vocal sound."

The end result was Alabama's tenth No. 1 song on the Billboard Hot Country Singles chart. In addition, "The Closer You Get" registered enough airplay on Top 40 radio stations to peak at No. 38 on the Billboard Hot 100.

A music video was filmed for the song, and has aired on CMT and Great American Country.

Single and album edits
The single version is a minute shorter than the original album version; the first verse and the second refrain is deleted from the single. The single edit is included on many of Alabama's compilation albums, including Greatest Hits Vol. II and For the Record.

Chart performance

Rita Coolidge

Don King

Alabama

Year-end charts

References

1981 singles
1983 singles
1981 songs
Rita Coolidge songs
Alabama (American band) songs
Don King (musician) songs
RPM Country Tracks number-one singles of the year
Songs written by Mark Gray (singer)
Songs written by J.P. Pennington
Song recordings produced by Harold Shedd
RCA Records Nashville singles